Wise Bay is an ice-filled inlet at the terminus of Ekblad Glacier, opening onto the Ross Ice Shelf just west of Driscoll Point. Named by the New Zealand Geological Survey Antarctic Expedition (NZGSAE) (1959–60) for K.C. Wise, who was a member of the expedition and wintered over in 1959.

Bays of Antarctica
Shackleton Coast